Catherine Pym (9 August 1921 – 28 March 2018) was an Australian fencer. She competed in the women's individual foil event at the 1952 Summer Olympics. Pym also competed at the 1950 British Empire Games in Auckland, New Zealand, where she won a bronze medal in the Women's Foil, Individual.

Early life
Born in the Sydney suburb of Strathfield in 1921 to Julius Tindall Pym of New Zealand and Irene Tootell of England, she was one of three girls. Pym started fencing after she left school at PLC, Croydon and went to train as a sports teacher at The Sword's Club in Sydney NSW. She taught in New Zealand and Australia before going to France in 1947 to gain more experience and to train for the British Empire Games. She spent 2 years in Paris, France to achieve this as there was not enough competition in Australia, fencing being a fledgling sport in Australia.

Fencing career
 1948: 2nd Australian woman to be awarded the coveted “Maitre d’Arm” from the Academie d’Armes in Paris, France. The highest qualification a fencer can achieve. 
 1949: NSW Champion, Woman's Individual Foil
 1950: NSW Champion, Woman's Individual Foil
 1950: Bronze Medal at the British Empire Games in Auckland, NZ in Woman's Individual Foil
 1952: Attended Helsinki Olympics to compete in the Woman's Individual Foil.  Eliminated in the first round of the Individual Foil, placing 30th overall out of 37 competitors.

Personal life 
Pym married Alan Onslow in 1954 and lived overseas until returning to Australia in 2000. They had 3 daughters together. Her fencing career ended when she married due to travel commitments but she continued teaching for pleasure. Pym died in March 2018 at the age of 96.

References

External links
 

1921 births
2018 deaths
Australian female foil fencers
Commonwealth Games bronze medallists for Australia
Commonwealth Games medallists in fencing
Fencers at the 1952 Summer Olympics
Olympic fencers of Australia
Fencers at the 1950 British Empire Games
Medallists at the 1950 British Empire Games